Hwang Jin-sung (黄镇晟，born May 5, 1984) is a South Korean footballer. He has played for Gangwon FC.

Club statistics

Honors

Club
Pohang Steelers
K-League Champion : 2007
Korean FA Cup (1): 2008
K-League Cup (1): 2009
AFC Champions League (1): 2009
FORTIS Hong Kong New Years cup(1):2010
2012 K League Best XI

References

External links

 
 Profile at ThePlayersAgent

1984 births
Living people
Association football midfielders
South Korean footballers
South Korean expatriate footballers
South Korean expatriate sportspeople in Belgium
Expatriate footballers in Belgium
Pohang Steelers players
A.F.C. Tubize players
Kyoto Sanga FC players
Fagiano Okayama players
Seongnam FC players
Gangwon FC players
K League 1 players
J2 League players
Footballers from Seoul